The Jozini Local Municipality council consists of forty-five members elected by mixed-member proportional representation. Twenty-three councillors are elected by first-past-the-post voting in twenty-three wards, while the remaining twenty-two are chosen from party lists so that the total number of party representatives is proportional to the number of votes received.

In the election of 1 November 2021 the Inkatha Freedom Party (IFP) won a majority of twenty-four seats.

Results 
The following table shows the composition of the council after past elections.

December 2000 election

The following table shows the results of the 2000 election.

March 2006 election

The following table shows the results of the 2006 election.

May 2011 election

The following table shows the results of the 2011 election.

August 2016 election

The following table shows the results of the 2016 election.

August 2016 to November 2021 by-elections 

The IFP, DA and EFF later gained an outright majority following a by-election held on 4 April 2018 in which a ward previously held by an ANC councillor was won by the IFP candidate. Council composition was reconfigured as seen below:

November 2021 election

The following table shows the results of the 2021 election.

References

Jozini
Elections in KwaZulu-Natal
Umkhanyakude District Municipality